"Dead Woman's Shoes" is the first segment of the ninth episode from the first season (1985–86) of the television series The Twilight Zone. It is a remake of "Dead Man's Shoes", an episode of the original Twilight Zone. It stars Helen Mirren as a timid woman who, upon trying on a recently murdered woman's shoes, is possessed by her vengeful spirit.

Plot
Maddie Duncan, a timid thrift store employee, finds a pair of expensive high-heeled shoes in a box of donations. After trying them on, she is possessed by the shoes' late owner: Susan Montgomery, the wife of wealthy lawyer Kyle Montgomery. Susan storms out of the store and catches a cab to her mansion. When the maid, Inez, objects to her entering, Susan is confused, seeming not to realize that her appearance is different. She unnerves Inez by mentioning the illicit bonus pay she has been getting from Kyle, and goes upstairs to have a bath. When Susan takes off her shoes, she turns back into Maddie, with no memory of what happened. Inez proceeds to run her off, but once she puts the shoes on, Maddie is again possessed by Susan.

Susan calls Kyle at work. She identifies herself and says she is at their home, but her voice is unfamiliar and so he assumes her to be a blackmailer. When he gets home and confronts her, Susan retells the events of her death, revealing how Kyle murdered her. He still assumes her to be blackmailing him, but when she kisses him he realizes that she is indeed Susan. Horrified, he goes for his handgun, but Susan has already confiscated it and begins shooting at him. He flees outside, where Susan's high-heeled shoes become an encumbrance. She takes them off and becomes Maddie again. Maddie drops the gun, and realizing that the shoes are somehow the trigger for her frightening blackouts, she discards them in a garbage can.

Fearing that if arrested, Susan will publicly disclose that her death was not an accident, Kyle does not give the police a description of Maddie. He instead abandons the mansion, and dismisses Inez. At a neighbor’s house, a maid notices Susan’s shoes in the trash can and puts them on. Now possessed by Susan, she picks up the dropped gun. Susan goes back to the Montgomery manor, where she enters the access code and goes inside. A gunshot is heard, presumably resulting in Kyle’s death.

External links
 
 Postcards from the Zone episode 1.21 Dead Woman's Shoes

1985 American television episodes
The Twilight Zone (1985 TV series season 1) episodes
Television episodes about spirit possession
Television remakes

fr:Les Escarpins de feue Suzanne